"2 Hearts 1 Love" is a song by English boy band 911. It was their first single release since "Wonderland" in 1999. The song, along with its corresponding album Illuminate... (The Hits and More), was released on 8 September 2013. The song was written by the group members. The album, 911's first release in 14 years, features seven of their greatest hits re-recorded, alongside seven brand new tracks written by the group - including "2 Hearts 1 Love".

Live performances
911 first performed the song at Big Summer Sessions in Swindon on 27 July 2013. They also performed it on Big Brother's Bit on the Side on 4 August 2013 and on This Morning the following day.

References

2013 singles
2013 songs
911 (English group) songs